Ana Julia García Villalobos (born 19 June 1961 in Langue, Valle) is a Honduran politician. She served as deputy of the National Congress of Honduras representing the National Party of Honduras for Valle.

References

1961 births
Living people
People from Valle Department
Deputies of the National Congress of Honduras
National Party of Honduras politicians
21st-century Honduran women politicians
21st-century Honduran politicians